ArthroCare (NASDAQ: ARTC) is a United States-based public company in the field of medical devices. The prime focus of the company is soft tissue repair and ablation technology in the medical areas of larger joints (knee, hip, and shoulder), spine as well as ENT.

Controversies
In 2008, several class actions were filed against ArthroCare, alleging that ArthroCare issued materially false and misleading statements and failed to disclose some adverse facts. In 2012, a settlement of $74 million was approved.

References

External links
A Case of Corporate Greed

Medical technology companies of the United States